A town is a type of municipality in the Canadian Province of Nova Scotia. Towns are incorporated by order by the Nova Scotia Utility and Review Board pursuant to sections 383 through 388 of Nova Scotia's Municipal Government Act.

Nova Scotia had 26 towns at the time of the 2016 Census. In 2016, the towns had a cumulative population of 97,495. Nova Scotia's largest and smallest towns are Truro and Annapolis Royal with populations of 12,261 and 491 respectively.

List

Former towns

See also 
Demographics of Nova Scotia
Geography of Nova Scotia
List of communities in Nova Scotia
List of counties of Nova Scotia

List of municipalities in Nova Scotia
List of villages in Nova Scotia

References 

Towns